Reforma 222 is a mixed-use complex on Paseo de la Reforma just west of Avenida de los Insurgentes in the Colonia Juárez neighborhood of Mexico City. Construction started in 2004; the complex opened in November 2007 and consists of three towers designed by Mexican architect Teodoro González de León, who also designed the National Auditorium and Museo Rufino Tamayo.

Towers 1 and 2 rank among the top 30 tallest buildings in Mexico City. The height of the towers is as follows:
 Tower 1: 125.8m, 31 stories, offices 
 Tower 2: 125.8m, 26 stories, residential
 Tower 3: 93.4m, 19 floors

See also
List of tallest buildings in Mexico City

External links
 Reforma222.com Official website
 Official website for shopping center
 Page on Grupo Danhos (contractor) site
 Skyscraperpage (Complejo Reforma 222)
 Skyscraperpage (Torre 1)
 Skyscraperpage (Torre 2)

References 

Paseo de la Reforma
Skyscraper office buildings in Mexico City
Shopping malls in Greater Mexico City
Shopping malls established in 2004
Mixed-use developments in Mexico
Skyscrapers in Mexico City
Residential skyscrapers in Mexico